Sang Kar (also Romanized as Sang Kār and Sang-e Kar; also known as Sangar) is a village in Kiskan Rural District, in the Central District of Baft County, Kerman Province, Iran. At the 2006 census, its population was 113, in 27 families.

References 

Populated places in Baft County